The AN/ALQ-99 is an airborne electronic warfare system, found on EA-6B and EA-18G Growler military aircraft.  The ALQ-99E version of the system was carried on the EF-111A Raven aircraft as an escort or standoff jammer.

Description
The ALQ-99 is an airborne integrated jamming system designed and manufactured by EDO Corporation. Receiver equipment and antennas are mounted in a fin-tip pod while jamming transmitters and exciter equipment are located in under-wing pods. The system is capable of intercepting, automatically processing and jamming received radio frequency signals. The system receivers can also be used to detect, identify and direction find those signals, providing signals intelligence (SIGINT) either automatically or manually.

The AN/ALQ-99 was mounted on the U.S. Navy's and U.S. Marine Corps EA-6B Prowler aircraft and U.S. Navy's EA-18G Growler aircraft.  It was mounted on U.S. Air Force's EF-111A Raven aircraft before these aircraft were retired from service by May 1998. The U.S. Navy's EA-6B Prowler were Retired from Active service following deployment in 2015.

The AN/ALQ-99 has a maximum power output of 10.8 kW in its older versions and of 6.8 kW in its newer versions. It uses a ram air turbine to supply its own power.

History

The AN/ALQ-99 has been used during the Vietnam War (1972–1973), Operation El Dorado Canyon (1986 American raid in Libya), 1991 Gulf War, Operation Northern Watch (1992–2003), Operation Southern Watch (1997–2003), 1999 Balkans War, 2003 Second Gulf War, and 2011 Operation Odyssey Dawn. The poor reliability of the ALQ-99 and frequent failures of the Built-In Test (BIT) have caused crew to fly missions with undetected faults. The ALQ-99 also interferes with the aircraft's AESA radar, reduces the top speed of the aircraft and imposes a high workload on the two-person crew when employed in the EA-18G Growler.

Versions
 AN/ALQ-99E – the version mounted on EF-111A aircraft. It has a 70% commonality with the U.S. Navy's AN/ALQ-99 systems.

See also
 CAMPS Civil Aircraft Missile Protection System
 Electronic warfare
 Electronic countermeasures
 EA-6B Prowler
 EA-18G Growler
 Next Generation Jammer

Related ECMs
 AN/ALQ-128
 AN/ALQ-144

References

External links

 The Anatomy of the Tacjammer
 Advanced Ram Air Driven Power and Cooling Unit (for ALQ-99 and nextgen equipment)
 EDO Corp – Manufacturer of components of the ALQ-99 system
 Harris Corporation acquired EDO in 2016

Electronic countermeasures
Equipment of the United States Air Force
Military electronics of the United States
Electronic warfare equipment
Military equipment introduced in the 1970s